The Kerala State Film Award for Second Best Film is an award presented annually at the Kerala State Film Awards of India to the second best film in Malayalam cinema. The awards are managed directly by the Kerala State Chalachitra Academy under the Department of Cultural Affairs of the Government of Kerala.

Winners

Kerala State Film Award for Third Best Film
The Kerala State Film Award for Third Best Film was an award presented from 1969 to 1972, afterwards, it was discontinued.

See also
 Kerala State Film Award for Best Film

References

External links
Official website
PRD, Govt. of Kerala: Awardees List

Kerala State Film Awards